"Theme from Mission: Impossible" is the theme tune of the TV series Mission: Impossible (1966–1973). The theme was written and composed by Argentine composer Lalo Schifrin and has since gone on to appear in several other works of the Mission: Impossible franchise, including the 1988 TV series, the film series, and the video game series.

Overview
The theme is written in a  time signature, which Schifrin has jokingly explained as being "for people who have five legs". Schifrin started from the Morse code for M.I. which is "_ _ .."; if a dot is one beat and a dash is one and a half beats, then this gives a bar of five beats, exactly matching the underlying rhythm. Schifrin's working title for the song was "Burning Fuse." Schifrin compared his writing process to writing a letter: "When you write a letter, you don’t have to think what grammar or what syntaxes you’re going to use, you just write a letter. And that’s the way it came." He estimated that he wrote it in about three minutes.

The actor Martin Landau, who played the character Rollin Hand on the show, attended the recording session for the theme song. "Lalo raised his wand to the musicians and I heard 'dun dun, da da, dun dun, da da' for the first time, and it was deafening," Landau recalled. "Lalo interrupted the band and said, 'no, no, it should be like this.' They resumed and before we could say anything, they had recorded it. I was stunned. It was so perfect. I came out humming that tune."

Reception 
The original single release peaked at number 41 on the Billboard Hot 100 and 19 on the magazine's Adult Contemporary chart in 1967. Also in that year, two years before Leonard Nimoy began playing the role of Paris in Mission Impossible, the theme appeared on the album Leonard Nimoy Presents Mr. Spock's Music From Outer Space (Nimoy did not perform on the song).

Awards 
The theme won for the Best Instrumental Theme at the 10th Grammy Awards held on February 29, 1968.

Schifrin's version, as performed with the London Philharmonic Orchestra, received a nomination for the Grammy Award for Best Pop Instrumental Performance for the 39th Grammy Awards held in 1997. The Clayton and Mullen version was also nominated for the same award in the same edition.

Track listing

7" Single
 "Mission: Impossible" – 2:31
 "Jim on the Move" - 3:12

Charts

Adam Clayton and Larry Mullen Jr. version

In 1996, the theme was remade by U2 members Adam Clayton and Larry Mullen Jr. for the soundtrack to the film. The duo recorded two versions of the song, the main theme and another subtitled "Mission Accomplished". The main theme was used during the end credits. Unlike the original, the majority of this version is in common time, with the exception of the intro.

Chart performance
The instrumental became a worldwide hit. In the United States, it peaked at number seven on the Billboard Hot 100 and received a gold certification, selling 500,000 copies there. It additionally peaked at number one in Finland, Hungary and Iceland, number two in Australia and Ireland, and number seven in the United Kingdom.

Critical reception
Larry Flick from Billboard wrote that U2 members Clayton and Mullen "cover the film's instantly recognizable theme, effectively funking it up for the '90s with a shuffling jeep beat." He complimented Lalo Schifrin's melody as "suspenseful and compelling as ever" and added, "It'll give fans of the TV show a fun jolt while entertaining a whole new generation." Dave Sholin from the Gavin Report commented, "Those not familiar with this piece of music A) are under five years of age, B) have been living with Theodore Kaczynski for the past 25 years, or C) are not aware of television. This interpretation by half of U2 will be heard by millions of moviegoers expected to see what's been anticipated as the film of the summer. Try cranking this up and driving around the hills of San Francisco! Very cool." A reviewer from Music Week rated it four out of five, adding that the song "should be massive". The magazine's Alan Jones stated, "They have successfully updated it while retaining its more memorable motifs and drafted in mixers including Junior Vasquez, Guru and Goldie to give it a variety of dancefloor flavourings."

Music video
The accompanying music video for "Theme from Mission: Impossible" was directed by English singer, songwriter, musician and music video director Kevin Godley.

Track listings
 CD single

 12-inch single

Charts

Weekly charts

Year-end charts

Certifications

Other cover versions and renditions 
Jazz organist Jimmy Smith recorded a cover version for his 1968 album Livin' It Up.

One cover version was recorded by French No Wave artist Lizzy Mercier Descloux on her 1979 album, Press Color.

A version of the theme was used during the panty raid sequence of the 1984 movie Revenge of the Nerds.

The theme's melodies form the basis of Limp Bizkit's 2000 single "Take a Look Around", which was recorded for the soundtrack of the second film.

Russian ethnic band Bugotak recorded a Russian-language rap song with ethnic Siberian instruments based on "Take a Look Around", the theme and "Empty Spaces" by Pink Floyd, entitled "Missiya Maadai-kara nevypolnima".

American rapper Kanye West and producer Jon Brion created a remix version at the end credits of the third film.

Brave Combo covered the theme as a "deep groove cumbia" on their 2008 album, The Exotic Rocking Life.

Houston rapper Chamillionaire, remixed the theme song for his cancelled third album Venom in 2010.

In 2010, a fictionalized account of Lalo Schifrin's creation of the Mission: Impossible tune was featured in a Lipton TV commercial aired in a number of countries around the world.

Tiësto created a dance remix version of the theme to promote the fourth film in the series Mission: Impossible – Ghost Protocol (2011).

In January 2013, violinist and dancer Lindsey Stirling and The Piano Guys, Steven Sharp Nelson (cello) and Jon Schmidt (piano), released their interpretation of the "Theme from Mission: Impossible". The arrangement is true to the Schifrin original, but also employs a passage with a liberal use of the Piano Sonata in C by Wolfgang Amadeus Mozart K. 545 first movement and a self-composed passage to end the piece. The arrangement was introduced with a music video having a comedic cloak and dagger theme. Two official copies of the video have garnered nearly 10.7 million views (as of April 2021) on Lindsey Stirling's YouTube channel and over 20 million views on The Piano Guys YouTube channel (as of April 2021).

For the promotion of the fifth film Mission: Impossible – Rogue Nation (2015), Japanese guitarist Miyavi covered the theme.

References

External links
 , performed by Lalo Schifrin, James Morrison and the Czech National Symphony Orchestra
 , performed by Schifrin feat. Morrison at the Munich Philharmonic Hall in 1994
 

Compositions by Lalo Schifrin
1966 songs
1967 singles
1996 singles
Dot Records singles
Mission: Impossible music
Music videos directed by Kevin Godley
Television drama theme songs
1960s instrumentals
Number-one singles in Finland
Number-one singles in Hungary
Number-one singles in Iceland